Advances in Nutrition (subtitled: An International Review Journal) is a bimonthly peer-reviewed  medical journal publishing review articles in the field of nutrition science. It was established in 2010 and is published by the American Society for Nutrition. The editor-in-chief is Katherine Tucker (University of Massachusetts Lowell). According to the Journal Citation Reports, the journal has a 2017 impact factor of 6.853.

References

External links

 Bimonthly journals
Nutrition and dietetics journals
Academic journals published by learned and professional societies
Publications established in 2010
Review journals
English-language journals